When Eagles Dare is a British sports documentary television series on Amazon Prime Video. The series follows Crystal Palace Football Club during their 2012–13 league campaign, which concluded with the club gaining promotion to the Premier League after winning the Championship play-offs. The series features fly-on-the-wall footage recorded during that league season, which had never been released, as well as interviews with celebrity supporters, players and staff that were involved throughout the season.

The series, consisting of five episodes, was released on 4 June 2021.

Cast

Staff
 Steve Parish
 Ian Holloway
 Stephen Browett 
 Dougie Freedman  
 Chris Grierson 
 Scott Guyett

Players
 Wilfried Zaha     
 Damien Delaney      
 Mile Jedinak     
 Glenn Murray   
 Peter Ramage     
 Julián Speroni       
 Joel Ward 
 Jonny Williams    
 Yannick Bolasie         
 Kevin Phillips

Supporters
 Kevin Day
 Doc Brown  
 Mark Bright 
 Mark Steel

Episodes

References

External links
 

2021 British television series debuts
English-language television shows
Amazon Prime Video original programming
2020s British television series